The Sanda Secondary School is a secondary school in Huskvarna, Sweden, opened for the 1970-1971 school year. Since 1979, the school has a sports profile, starting with basketball and cross-country skiing. Later, more sports have been added, for example ice hockey (starting in the 1995-1996 season/school year). In the 2005-2006 season/school year, the school won the Swedish Boys' Floorball Championship for boys born 1987.

References

External links

1970 establishments in Sweden
Buildings and structures in Jönköping Municipality
Educational institutions established in 1970
Huskvarna
Schools in Sweden